Marvin Earl Whaley  (June 25, 1924 – February 20, 2007) was a Canadian football player who played for the Toronto Argonauts. He won the Grey Cup with the Argonauts in 1950. He played college football for Morgan State University. He died in 2007.

References

1924 births
2007 deaths
People from Haynesville, Louisiana
Players of American football from Louisiana
Toronto Argonauts players